Spilarctia sinica is a moth in the family Erebidae. It was described by Franz Daniel in 1943. It is found in China (Sichuan, Yunnan, Zhejiang, Hunan, Hubei).

References

Moths described in 1943
sinica